Club Baloncesto Ciudad de Ponferrada, also known as Cat&Rest Clínica Ponferrada CDP by sponsorship reasons, is a professional basketball team based in Ponferrada, Castilla y León that currently plays in LEB Plata.

History
CB Ciudad de Ponferrada was founded in 2002 with the aim to replace the former team JT, that ceased in activity. The club started playing in the fifth tier and five years later, achieved their first promotion to Liga EBA. However, Ciudad de Ponferrada could not remain in the league EBA and was relegated again.

After some years between regional and provincial leagues, in 2013 the club failed to promote again in the final stage played in Ponferrada. However, two years later, Ciudad de Ponferrada achieved a vacant berth in the league EBA.

On 18 May 2019, Ciudad de Ponferrada achieved promotion to LEB Plata, tier three after leading the group A-B and finishing unbeaten in the final stage.

Season by season

Notable players

 Alex Laurent

References

External links
Official Page

Sport in Ponferrada
Basketball teams established in 2002
Basketball teams in Castile and León
LEB Plata teams
Former Liga EBA teams